Mack Rutherford is a British-Belgian aviator, born 21 June 2005. In 2022 he became the youngest person ever to fly solo around the world on the 24th August of that year (and first ever minor, under eighteen years old). He holds four Guinness World Records: These include youngest person to fly solo around the world - previously held by Travis Ludlow and youngest person to fly a microlight solo around the world - previously held by his sister Zara Rutherford.

His successful record attempt received significant global exposure    for his mission explaining that young people make a difference.

On 12 September 2022, the Honourable Company of Air Pilots announced that Rutherford had been awarded the Master's Medal.

See also 

 List of circumnavigations

References 

2005 births
Belgian aviation record holders
Belgian people of British descent
British aviation record holders
Circumnavigators of the globe
English aviators
Living people